MCJ Co., Ltd. is a Japanese company active in the personal computer, entertainment, information and communication industries. MCJ itself is a holding company, responsible for the management of the group companies. MCJ Group companies include Mouse Computer Co., Ltd, UNIT.COM INC., Tekwind Co., Ltd, iiyama Benelux B.V., R-Logic International Pte Ltd and aprecio Corporation Ltd. R-Logic, which provides repair services for IT products, was converted into a subsidiary in January 2018 when MCJ acquired a 60 percent stake in the company.

References

External links
 Official website

Information technology companies of Japan